In statistics, probability density estimation or simply density estimation is the construction of an estimate, based on observed data, of an unobservable underlying probability density function.  The unobservable density function is thought of as the density according to which a large population is distributed; the data are usually thought of as a random sample from that population.

A variety of approaches to density estimation are used, including Parzen windows and a range of data clustering techniques, including vector quantization. The most basic form of density estimation is a rescaled histogram.

Example 

We will consider records of the incidence of diabetes. The following is quoted verbatim from the data set description:

A population of women who were at least 21 years old, of Pima Indian heritage and living near Phoenix, Arizona,  was tested for diabetes mellitus according to World Health Organization criteria.  The data were collected by the US National Institute of Diabetes and Digestive and Kidney Diseases. We used the 532 complete records.

In this example, we construct three density estimates for "glu" (plasma glucose concentration), one conditional on the presence of diabetes,
the second conditional on the absence of diabetes, and the third not conditional on diabetes.
The conditional density estimates are then used to construct the probability of diabetes conditional on "glu".

The "glu" data were obtained from the MASS package of the R programming language. Within R, ?Pima.tr and ?Pima.te give a fuller account of the data.

The mean of "glu" in the diabetes cases is 143.1 and the standard deviation is 31.26.
The mean of "glu" in the non-diabetes cases is 110.0 and the standard deviation is 24.29.
From this we see that, in this data set, diabetes cases are associated with greater levels of "glu".
This will be made clearer by plots of the estimated density functions.

The first figure shows density estimates of p(glu | diabetes=1), p(glu | diabetes=0), and p(glu).
The density estimates are kernel density estimates using a Gaussian kernel. That is, a Gaussian density function is placed at each data point, and the sum of the density functions is computed over the range of the data.

From the density of "glu" conditional on diabetes, we can obtain the probability of diabetes conditional on "glu" via Bayes' rule. For brevity, "diabetes" is abbreviated "db." in this formula.

The second figure shows the estimated posterior probability p(diabetes=1 | glu). From these data, it appears that an increased level of "glu" is associated with diabetes.

Application and Purpose 
A very natural use of density estimates is in the informal investigation of the properties of a given set of data. Density estimates can give valuable indication of such features as skewness and multimodality in the data. In some cases they will yield conclusions that may then be regarded as self-evidently true, while in others all they will do is to point the way to further analysis and/or data collection.

An important aspect of statistics is often the presentation of data back to the client in order to provide explanation and illustration of conclusions that may possibly have been obtained by other means. Density estimates are ideal for this purpose, for the simple reason that they are fairly easily comprehensible to non-mathematicians.

More examples illustrating the use of density estimates for exploratory and presentational purposes, including the important case of bivariate data.

Density estimation is also frequently used in anomaly detection or novelty detection: if an observation lies in a very low-density region, it is likely to be an anomaly or a novelty.

 In hydrology the histogram and estimated density function of rainfall and river discharge data, analysed with a probability distribution, are used to gain insight in their behaviour and frequency of occurrence. An example is shown in the blue figure.

Kernel density estimation

See also 
 Kernel density estimation
 Mean integrated squared error
 Histogram 
 Multivariate kernel density estimation
 Spectral density estimation
 Kernel embedding of distributions
 Generative model
 Application of Order Statistics: Non-parametric Density Estimation
 Probability distribution fitting

References 

Sources
 
 Trevor Hastie, Robert Tibshirani, and Jerome Friedman. The Elements of Statistical Learning. New York: Springer, 2001. . (See Chapter 6.)
 Qi Li and Jeffrey S. Racine. Nonparametric Econometrics: Theory and Practice. Princeton University Press, 2007, . (See Chapter 1.)
 D.W. Scott. Multivariate Density Estimation. Theory, Practice and Visualization. New York: Wiley, 1992.
 B.W. Silverman. Density Estimation. London: Chapman and Hall, 1986.

External links
 CREEM: Centre for Research Into Ecological and Environmental Modelling Downloads for free density estimation software packages Distance 4 (from Research Unit for Wildlife Population Assessment "RUWPA") and WiSP.
 UCI Machine Learning Repository Content Summary (See "Pima Indians Diabetes Database" for the original data set of 732 records, and additional notes.)
 MATLAB code for one dimensional   and  two dimensional  density estimation 
 libAGF C++ software for variable kernel density estimation.

Nonparametric statistics